Georgia-Pacific LLC is an American pulp and paper company based in Atlanta, Georgia, and is one of the world's largest manufacturers and distributors of tissue, pulp, paper, toilet and paper towel dispensers, packaging, building products and related chemicals. As of Fall 2019, the company employed more than 35,000 people at more than 180 locations in North America, South America and Europe.  It is an independently operated and managed subsidiary of Koch Industries.

History

Georgia-Pacific was founded by Owen Robertson Cheatham on September 22, 1927 in Augusta, Georgia, as the Georgia Hardwood Lumber Co. Over the years it expanded, adding sawmills and plywood plants. The company acquired its first West Coast facility in 1947 and changed its name to Georgia-Pacific Plywood & Lumber Company in 1948. In 1956, the company changed its name to Georgia-Pacific Corporation. In 1957 the company entered the pulp and paper business by building a kraft pulp and linerboard mill at Toledo, Oregon. The company continued to make a series of acquisitions, including US Plywood in 1987, Great Northern Nekoosa in 1990, and the Fort James Corporation in 2000. The Fort James Corporation was the result of a series of mergers of enterprises that included the Fort Howard Corporation, the James River Corporation and Crown-Zellerbach.

It was announced on November 13, 2005 that Georgia-Pacific would be acquired by Koch Industries. On December 23, 2005, Koch Industries finalized the $21 billion acquisition of Georgia-Pacific. Georgia-Pacific was removed from the NYSE (it had traded under the symbol GP) and shareholders surrendered their shares for about $48 per share. Initially, Koch was only interested in the GP Building Products Business but GP CEO & President, Pete Correll refused to break up the company. Koch soon realized that they struck gold with the very lucrative NA Consumer Products Business. Koch Industries then spent the next 6 years focused on offloading the European business which was eventually made possible by a huge business turn around of the UK business. Koch sold to the European business in 2013 to SCA (now Essity) with a proviso from The European Competition Commission that the UK & Ireland  Consumer Products business had to be separated and sold off.

The Georgia-Pacific Tower in Atlanta continues to house the company's headquarters. The Crown Zellerbach Building was built as the headquarters of Crown Zellerbach in San Francisco in 1959.

On January 11, 2010, Georgia-Pacific signed an agreement to acquire Grant Forest Products' oriented strand board ("OSB") facility at Englehart, Ontario and the associated facility at Earlton, Ontario, as well as its OSB facilities at Clarendon and Allendale, South Carolina, for approximately $400 million.   The transaction closed in July 2013, following Canadian regulatory review and US court approval under the Hart-Scott-Rodino merger review process.

On June 19, 2014, Georgia-Pacific announced it will acquire SPG Holdings. In 2018, Georgia-Pacific's facilities in Taylorsville, Mississippi were the site of a two-week labor strike.

Brand names

Georgia-Pacific operates under many different brand names.
 Angel Soft and Quilted Northern are toilet paper and facial tissue brands.
 Blue Ribbon, Clutter Cutter, DensArmor Plus, DensDeck, DensGlass, DensShield, DryPly, FireGuard, GP Lam, Hushboard, Nautilus, Ply-Bead, Plytanium, Southern Gold, Sta-Strait, Thermostat, ToughRock, Wood I Beam, and XJ 85 are building and remodeling brands.
 Sparkle and Brawny are paper towel brands.
 Mardi Gras and Vanity Fair are napkin brands.
 Dixie Insulair, PerfecTouch, and Ultra are tableware brands.
 Advantage, Image Plus, and Spectrum are office paper brands.

Discontinued brands include Soft n' Gentle (toilet paper), Zee (napkins and paper towels), and Mardi Gras-branded paper towels.  The toilet paper, paper towel, and napkin brands are sold in different price segments, with the Angel Soft, Sparkle, and Mardi Gras brands being more value-priced and the Quilted Northern, Brawny, and Vanity Fair brands being premium offerings.

Environmental record

Stephen Engelberg of The New York Times wrote that in 1995, Georgia-Pacific persuaded the U.S. Senate Judiciary Committee to approve an amendment that derailed a pending E.P.A. investigation of Weyerhauser Company, Louisiana-Pacific Corporation, and Georgia-Pacific, arguing that the E.P.A. was "unfairly applying present-day standards to decisions made 10 to 15 years ago", and that the E.P.A. test method overstated the emissions from wood products factories. Georgia-Pacific's opponents believed "the measure could allow Georgia-Pacific avoid installing pollution gear at many of its plants."  Engelberg wrote, "Nonetheless, [Georgia-Pacific] said they would install controls at plants that need them."

Georgia-Pacific is also involved in several remediation sites, many of which were landfills used by other manufacturers, municipalities and other businesses, and individuals. Two of the primary remediation sites - the Fox River in Wisconsin and Kalamazoo River in Michigan - involve the cleanup of PCBs. Georgia Pacific is contributing to dam removal work as part of an effort to clean up PCB contamination in Kalamazoo.

In 2007, the EPA announced legal agreements among itself, Michigan, Georgia-Pacific, and Millennium Holdings (a corporate successor of the Allied Paper Corporation) requiring the companies to clean up an estimated $21,000,000 worth of environmental damage to the Plainwell Impoundment Area.  Another settlement required an additional $15,000,000 of environmental work on the Kalamazoo River Superfund Site.

Georgia-Pacific is the largest user of de-ink fiber in the world, and its subsidiary company GP Harmon trades in the recycled material.  The company has expanded into other markets in countries like Mexico and China.  In 2005, president of the division Simon Davies estimated that China would require the import of scrap paper from the US and elsewhere for at least 15 years.  In the long run, he asserted, the growth of the Chinese middle class would be correlated with a large increase in paper production, and having viable paper recovery systems in place would be of great value to them.

The Georgia-Pacific Paper Mill in Crossett, Arkansas was the subject of environmental documentary film Company Town, released in 2016. The film alleges that improper waste disposal by the mill has caused a cluster of cancer incidents in the area around the mill.

Awards and charity
In 2009, the EPA awarded Koch subsidiary Georgia-Pacific its SmartWay Excellence award, "an innovative collaboration between the U.S. Environmental Protection Agency (EPA) and the freight industry designed to increase energy efficiency while significantly reducing air pollution,"  and specifically commended Georgia-Pacific.  The award states:

In, 2008, 93 percent of Georgia-Pacific's freight was hauled by SmartWay Transport Partners, an increase of 47 percent over the previous year.  Of the 145 carriers Georgia-Pacific uses, 104 were SmartWay carriers, an increase of 33 percent over 2007.  In 2008, Georgia-Pacific experienced tremendous growth in its intermodal shipping.  Georgia-Pacific was able to work with its customers to increase lead-time and create more intermodal freight shipments without significantly impacting customer's needs, thus increasing intermodal loads by 39 percent in 2008 as compared to 2007.  Georgia-Pacific uses advanced software to pack loads more efficiently and increase cube utilization in its trailers.  The company also reduced empty loads by 10 percent, increased utilization of local fleets, and established an idling reduction policy in place at its 12 distribution centers. In the summer of 2008, Georgia Pacific held a fuel conservation summit to explore ways for shippers and carriers to work together to further reduce fuel consumption from its freight transport operations.

The Georgia-Pacific Foundation Scholarship Program for Employees' Children has awarded nearly $10.5 million in college scholarships to children of the company's employees between 1988 and 2013.

References

External links

Historical Annual Reports for Crown Zellerbach
World's largest recycler of recovered wastepaper

 
1927 establishments in Georgia (U.S. state)
2005 mergers and acquisitions
American companies established in 1927
American corporate subsidiaries
Companies formerly listed on the New York Stock Exchange
Forest products companies of the United States
Koch Industries
Manufacturing companies established in 1927
Pulp and paper companies of the United States
Renewable resource companies established in 1927